Günter Meisner (18 April 1926 – 5 December 1994) was a German film and television character actor. He is remembered for his several cinematic portrayals of Adolf Hitler and for his role as Arthur Slugworth in Willy Wonka & the Chocolate Factory. He was fluent in four languages and appeared in many English-language, German-language and French-language films.

Career
Born in Bremen, Meisner briefly worked at a steel foundry before training as a radio operator with the Luftwaffe's Fallschirmjäger (paratroopers). After the war, though he was interested in a career in sculpture and painting, in 1948 he switched to drama and studied under Gustaf Gründgens at Düsseldorf's State Conservatory, where he also got his first job at the local Schauspielhaus.

Film and TV
Meisner often played stock character Nazi officers and other sinister characters. He portrayed Hitler in the 1982 Franco-German action comedy, L'as des as (Ace of Aces), and in the ABC television miniseries, The Winds of War (miniseries). He also appeared in the CBS miniseries, Blood and Honor and Southern Television's Winston Churchill: The Wilderness Years.

Other films Meisner took part in were Is Paris Burning?, The Quiller Memorandum, Funeral in Berlin, and The Boys from Brazil. He was Mr. Slugworth/Mr. Wilkinson in the 1971 film version of Willy Wonka & the Chocolate Factory. He also appeared in several television commercials.

Theatre
As a theatre actor and director, Meisner founded the Gallery Diogenes in Berlin in 1959 for visual art and mainly absurd theater. In 1961, he also founded the International Association for Arts and Sciences.

Africa
From 1967 to 1969 Meisner participated in relief efforts in Biafra, Nigeria. He also produced two films criticising racial discrimination: Don't Look for Me in Places Where I Can't Be Found and Bega Dwa Bega (One for All), a Swahili-language film for the Tanzanian Film Unit.

Death
Meisner died on 5 December 1994 at the age of 68 of heart failure, during the filming of an episode of the television series Tatort. He is buried in Berlin's Friedhof Heerstraße Cemetery.

Selected filmography

1957: A Time to Love and a Time to Die (uncredited)
1957: Kopf oder Zahl, as Kid
1958: Viel Lärm um nichts
1958: Here I Am, Here I Stay (Hier bin ich – hier bleib ich)
1959: Aus dem Tagebuch eines Frauenarztes
1959: Babette Goes to War (Babette s'en va-t-en guerre)
1959: The Death Ship (Das Totenschiff), as Paul, Trimmer auf der Yorikke
1959: The Black Chapel, as 1. Killer 
1961: Question 7, as Schmidt
1961: The Miracle of Father Malachia (Das Wunder des Malachias), as Crazy Preacher
1961: , as Redner Meetingsaal
1961: , as Redner (uncredited)
1962: The Counterfeit Traitor, as Priest (uncredited)
1962: Das Testament des Dr. Mabuse, as Kurzschluß-Henry (uncredited)
1963: The Black Cobra (Die schwarze Kobra), as Wunderlich ('Mr. Green')
1963: Hafenpolizei - Der blaue Brief (TV series), as Johnny Massels
1964: Murderer in the Fog, as Kriminalassistent Behrend
1965: Code Name: Jaguar, as Russian Officer
1966:  (1966, TV miniseries), as Smiler Jackson
1966: Is Paris Burning? (Paris brûle-t-il?), as Commandant SS à Pantin 
1966: The Quiller Memorandum, as Hassler
1966: Funeral in Berlin, as Kreutzman
1967: The Monk with the Whip, as Greaves
1969: The Bridge at Remagen, as SS Gen. Gerlach 
1970: Hauser's Memory, as Korowiew
1970: Poker - Poker (Short)
1971: Willy Wonka & the Chocolate Factory, as Arthur Slugworth
1971: Ludwig L (Short film), as Der Betrunkene
1973: The Battle of Sutjeska, as German General
1973: Werwölfe
1974: Die Verrohung des Franz Blum, as Borsig
1974: The Odessa File, as General Greifer
1974: Borsalino & Co., as Le médecin
1974: Between Wars, as Karl Schneider
1975: La Chair de l'orchidée, as L'avocat-conseil
1975: Familienglück, as Hektiker
1975: Inside Out, as Schmidt 
1976: Voyage of the Damned, as Robert Hoffman
1977: , as Pfarrer 
1977: 
1977: The Serpent's Egg, as Convict
1978: The Boys from Brazil, as Farnbach
1978: When Hitler Stole Pink Rabbit (TV film), as Berg
1979: Schöner Gigolo, armer Gigolo, as Betrunkener Arbeiter (uncredited)
1979: Breakthrough, as SS-Offizier
1979: Avalanche Express, as Rudi Muehler
1979: Ticket of No Return (Bildnis einer Trinkerin), as Direktor Willi
1979:  (TV miniseries)
1980: The American Success Company, as Maitre d'
1980: , as Patient
1980: , as Grimme
1980: Winston Churchill: The Wilderness Years (TV Series), as Adolf Hitler
1981: Silas (TV miniseries), as Fabian Fedder
1982: Night Crossing, as Major Koerner
1982: Blood and Honor: Youth Under Hitler (TV Series), as Schneider
1982: Rom ist in der kleinsten Hütte (TV Series) 
1982: , as Dr. Steiner
1982: L'As des as, as Adolf Hitler / Angela Hitler
1982: Zwei Tote im Sender und Don Carlos im Pogl (TV Movie), as Maskenbildner
1983: The Winds of War, as Adolf Hitler
1983: Plem, Plem - Die Schule brennt
1983: Chamäleon (TV Series)
1984: Under the Volcano, as Herr Krausberg - the German Attaché (uncredited)
1984: Der Mord mit der Schere (Short) 
1985: Drei gegen Drei, as Prof. Holl
1986: Close Up (Short film), as KGB-Chef
1986: Tras el cristal, as Klaus
1986: Das Geheimnis von Lismore Castle (TV Movie), as Sir Ralph Whitecombe
1986: Gestatten, Bestatter, as Herr Abendroth
1987: Die Saat des Hasses (Visperas) (TV Series) 
1987: Indras Rache (Tout est dans la fin), as Hamerstein
1987: Der elegante Hund (TV Series) 
1988: , as Bobby Steinbeck
1989: Magdalene, as Prior
1989: Bride of the Orient (La Fiancée thaïlandaise / Gekauftes Glück), as Pfarrer Barmettler
1989: Roselyne et les lions, as Klint
1989: The Saint: The Big Bang (TV Series), as Kuhler
1989: Moon Child (El niño de la luna), as Abuelo militar
1990: Estación Central, as Alex' friend
1990: The Man Inside, as Judge
1990: Il piccolo popolo (TV Movie), as Schneider
1990: Te Rua, as Prof. Biederstedt
1991: Leporella
1992: Ruby Cairo, as Herr Bruchner, EDK Executive
1993: Faraway, So Close! (In weiter Ferne, so nah!), as Fälscher
1993: Posthuman, as Doctor
1993: Harry & Sunny (TV Series), as Kneipenwirt
1994: The Violin Player (Le joueur de violon)
1994: Air Albatros (TV Series), as Lauffendingk Sr.
1994: Eine Mutter kämpft um ihren Sohn, as Wegener

External links

Gunter Meisner profile

1926 births
1994 deaths
German male film actors
German male television actors
Fallschirmjäger of World War II
20th-century German male actors